Wildcat Creek is a  creek in Lane County, Oregon, United States within the Siuslaw National Forest. The creek empties into the Siuslaw River at Austa on Oregon Route 126.

In the 19th century, the stream was named Walton Creek after Joshua J. Walton, a lawyer, Lane County judge, and member of the University of Oregon's board of regents. In the 20th century, the name was changed to Wildcat Creek.

Course
From its source, the creek flows west, then north to near Penn Road, where it receives Warden Creek from the right. Turning west again, the creek receives Salt Creek from the right and Bulmer Creek from the left before reaching the unincorporated community of Penn. Penn Road parallels the creek along this stretch to slightly beyond Penn, where the smaller road intersects Route 126. Near this intersection, Fish Creek enters from the right at about river mile (RM) 10 or river kilometer (RK) 16. Flowing west parallel to the highway, which is on its right, Wildcat Creek passes Walton, where it receives Chickahominy Creek from the right.

Downstream of Walton, Wildcat Creek turns south. Walker, Kirk, and Schultz creeks enter from the right, and then Pataha Creek enters from the left at the unincorporated community of Globe. The creek turns west again and passes under Highway 126 before reaching Austa.

See also 
 List of rivers of Oregon

References 

Rivers of Lane County, Oregon
Rivers of Oregon